Qabakh Tappeh (also Romanized as Qābākh Tappeh and Qabākh Tappeh) is a village in Kenarporuzh Rural District, in the Central District of Salmas County, West Azerbaijan Province, Iran. At the 2006 census, its population was 157, in 28 families.

References 

Populated places in Salmas County